Cathayia lineata is a species of snout moth in the genus Cathayia. It was described by Turner in 1942, and is known from Queensland, Australia.

References

Moths described in 1942
Galleriini